Rune Ohm (born 10 June 1980) is a Danish handballplayer (right back) who plays for the Danish team TMS Ringsted.

He started playing handball in Greve after which he went to Ajax Heroes. His next club was AaB Håndbold after which he played some games for the Daniush national team. After Aab he changed to the Spanish club BM Altea. After this club's financial problems he changed to another Spanish club, BM Antequera.

In 2008 he returned to Danish handball, when he signed with Skjern Håndbold.

As of July 2008 he has played 51 national games for Denmark

References 
 Skjern Håndbolds hjemmeside 

1980 births
Danish male handball players
Living people
Aalborg Håndbold players
SønderjyskE Håndbold players
People from Greve Municipality
Sportspeople from Region Zealand